Khamaria is a town and a nagar panchayat in Bhadohi district in the Indian state of Uttar Pradesh.

Demographics
 India census, Khamaria had a population of 27,581. Males constitute 48% of the population and females 52%. Khamaria has an average literacy rate of 36%, well below the national average of 59.5%: male literacy is 66%, and female literacy is 45%. In Khamaria, 13% of the population is under 6 years of age and 17% of the population is above 67 years of age.
The town has a major hospital (Khamaria Hospital). It has many carpet manufacturing export houses.

References

Cities and towns in Bhadohi district